Tylopilus orsonianus is a bolete fungus of the genus Tylopilus. It is found in the Pakaraima Mountains of Guyana, where it fruits singly to scattered on root mats of forests dominated by the tree Dicymbe corymbosa. It was first described scientifically in 2007 by Tara Fulgenzi and Terry Henkel. The spore print is flesh pink; the smooth spores are ellipsoid to somewhat fuse-shaped (subfusoid), inamyloid, and have dimensions of 11–14.5 by 4.9–7.4 μm.

References

External links
 

orsonianus
Fungi described in 2007
Fungi of Guyana